Johan Christian Castberg  (1 February 1911 – 1988) was a Norwegian illustrator and painter.

He was born in Bergen to Ida Anker and Torgrim Castberg, and was married twice, to Fredrikke Mustad, and to the pianist Ingrid Kjellstrøm.

In the 1930s and 1940s, Castberg worked as an illustrator in Norwegian and Swedish newspapers. After the Second World War, he established himself as a portrait painter. He also painted surrealistic fantasy landscapes.

References

1911 births
1988 deaths
Artists from Bergen
Norwegian illustrators
Norwegian portrait painters
Norwegian landscape painters